Sheikh Hassan Abdullah Hersi al-Turki (– 27 May 2015) was a Somali Islamist leader of al-Itihaad al-Islamiya (AIAI) and later of the Islamic Courts Union (ICU).

Biography
Al-Turki was born in the Ogaden. He hailed from the Reer Abdille subdivision of the Ogaden Darod clan. It is believed that al-Turki participated in the unsuccessful Ogaden War between Somalia and Ethiopia over control of the Somali-inhabited Ogaden region, and subsequently left the region to continue his revolutionary efforts in Somalia.

On 3 June 2004, al-Turki was designated, under US Presidential Executive Order 13224, for terrorist financing. He later became a military leader of ICU, and was in charge of the Dhobley situated near the North Eastern Province. He also led ICU forces in the taking of Jubaland.

On 23 September 2006, al-Turki forces approached Jilib, en route to Kismayo. In a result, Juba Valley Alliance forces withdrew without a fight. After the city fell, on 24 September, he promised peace to the city after Islamic militiamen broke up an anti-Islamist demonstration with gunfire, killing three teenagers. (Also see: Juba Valley Alliance § War in Somalia). Al-Turki addressed people in Kismayo, saying that the region would be under Sharia law. "This city is seized by Islamic forces including all tribes of Somali men and foreigners, welcome to the new peace brought to this city and I promise you will live in security and prosperity", he reportedly said.

He was later targeted in a US airstrike on 3 March 2008. The two Tomahawk cruise missiles hit two homes in Dhobley that were allegedly visited by al-Turki, who was believed to have ties to al-Qaeda.

Al-Turki was the leader of an insurgent group named the Ras Kamboni Brigades. The group merged with three other resistance groups, including Sheikh Hassan Dahir Aweys' Asmara-based wing of the Alliance for the Re-liberation of Somalia, to form Hizbul Islam.

Al-Turki died of an undisclosed illness on 27 May 2015.

References

Date of birth missing
1944 births
2015 deaths
Al-Shabaab (militant group) members
Leaders of Islamic terror groups